Among Thieves may refer to:
Among Thieves, an Australian group, best known for their 1991 single "Faith in Love".
"Among Thieves", a 1957 science fiction story by Poul Anderson, published in Astounding Stories
Among Thieves, the 2009 début novel by Mez Packer
Among Thieves, 2011 novel by Douglas Hulick
Among Thieves, the 2009 David Hosp novel inspired by the Isabella Stewart Gardner Museum theft
 Uncharted 2: Among Thieves, a 2009 video game

See also
Honor Among Thieves (disambiguation)